The Luneta Hotel is a historic hotel in Manila, Philippines. Named after its location across from Luneta (Rizal Park) on Kalaw Avenue in Ermita, it is one of the remaining structures that survived the Liberation of Manila in 1945. The hotel was completed in 1919. According to the study by Dean Joseph Fernandez of the University of Santo Tomas, the hotel was designed by the Spanish architect-engineer Salvador Farre. The structure is the only remaining example of French Renaissance architecture with Filipino stylized beaux arts in the Philippines to date. After being closed down and abandoned in 1987, the hotel was relaunched in May 2014 with the installation of a historical marker by the National Historical Commission of the Philippines.

History

The hotel was designed by the Spanish architect-engineer Salvador Farre in French Renaissance Belle Epoque style and completed in 1919.

Initially, the hotel was run by its owner L. Burchfield and general manager F.M. Lozano. Being near the Port of Manila, the hotel was popular with Navy officers and sailors of the Merchant Marines. It gained international fame due to hosting the delegates for the 33rd International Eucharistic Congress, held at Luneta Park, the first International Eucharistic Congress in Asia.

During World War II, the Luneta Hotel became a brothel of American G.I.s who were off to Corregidor after Manila had been declared an open city. Surviving veterans of the war still recall how the hotel served as a hope when it survived the bombardment and how it was turned into a comfort area for soldiers facing imminent death.

In its early years, the hotel became the site of European imports that were distributed to Manila. It was a time of beauty, innovation and peace. The hotel has been known to serve well-prepared breakfast and lunch, exotic among foreigners of the time. But the operations of the Luneta Hotel demanded high-maintenance and so it was neglected even by its owners.

Architecture 
Designed by Spanish architect Salvador Farre, the Luneta Hotel on Kalaw Avenue was built in 1919. The six-storey building towered at an undefined T.M. Kalaw street upon its completion. It faced an unfenced Bermuda plane of the Luneta. Its neighbors were blocks of "stone houses" (Bahay na bato) and "storerooms" (bodegas). It stood out because of its distinct architectural style. It symbolized the new influence that the Americans brought to the country. As once described by cultural writer and conservationist Bambi Harper, its "Mansard roof, French windows, carved details, attractive grilles and studied proportions" are reminiscent of French Renaissance architecture.

President Dwight Eisenhower wrote about the Luneta Hotel's beauty:

See also 
 List of hotels in Manila

References

External links 
Official website of the Luneta Hotel

Beaux-Arts architecture
Hotel buildings completed in 1919
Hotels in Manila
Buildings and structures in Ermita
Cultural Properties of the Philippines in Metro Manila
National Historical Landmarks of the Philippines